Selma Kučević (born 9 December 1991 in Tutin, Serbia) is a Serbian politician. She has been serving in the National Assembly of Serbia since 2020. She was re-elected to serve another tenure on 1 August 2022. She is a member of the Health and Family Committee and Committee on the Rights of the Child in the National Assembly of Serbia.

References 

Living people
1991 births
Serbian politicians
Party of Democratic Action of Sandžak politicians
Members of the National Assembly (Serbia)